Olenyok or Olenek may refer to:
Olenyok (river), a river in Russia
Olenyok (rural locality), a rural locality (a selo) in the Sakha Republic, Russia
Olenyok Airport, an airport in the same rural locality
Olenyok Gulf, a gulf in the Laptev Sea

See also
 Olenyoksky District